Oromocto was launched at Oromocto, New Brunswick in 1813. She then traded between England and the Caribbean. She started trading between England and India but in 1820 she became leaky on her way back to England from India, put into Maranham, and was condemned there in 1821.

Career
Oromocto sailed to England and was re-registered at Liverpool on 28 January 1814. She appeared in Lloyd's Register (LR) in 1815 with Campbell, master, Ritchie & Co., owners, and trade London–Yucatán.

On 18 and 19 October 1816 a hurricane hit Port-au-Prince. All the vessels in the harbour, except Orocamoto, were driven on shore or upset.

In 1813 the British East India Company (EIC) had lost its monopoly on the trade between India and Britain. British ships were then free to sail to India or the Indian Ocean under a license from the EIC.

On 23 October Oromocto sailed for Bombay.

In the first week of April 1819, Oromocto arrived at St Helena with a detachment of troops from the 22nd Regiment of Foot, who were replacing the 66th Regiment of Foot in their role of guarding Napoleon. On the 19th she sailed for England with a detachment of 400 men from the 66th.

Fate
On 5 January 1820 Oromocto, Strickland, master, sailed for Bombay.

Oromocto sailed for England via Rio de Janeiro. On 26 December 1820 she stopped at Maranham, Brazil, leaking badly. She was expected to have to discharge her cargo. The next report was that her cargo had been almost entirely landed and appeared in good order, except for the lowest tier of sugars. However, the source of the leak had not yet been determined. She was condemned on 1 February, not being worth the cost of repairs. She was sold for breaking up on 9 February 1821.

Citations

References
 
 

1813 ships
Ships built in Canada
Age of Sail merchant ships of England
Maritime incidents in December 1820